Melody is a cultivar of potato.

Description
It is yellow, with a smooth skin, and dry flesh. It can be boiled and mashed. Melody has a high yield potential and has an overall good disease resistance. It is resistant to late blight on tubers, common scab, bruising, Fusarium sulphureum (dry rot) and Globodera rostochiensis (a potato cyst nematode).

History
The breeder, Meijer Research B.V., a Dutch company, holds the rights until 2030.

Characteristics 
The 'Melody' potato features oval-shaped tubers with yellow skin and medium-yellow flesh. Its eyes have a relatively shallow depth, and the skin is smooth.

When sprouted, the base of the sprout is violet in colour; the plant itself reaches a medium height with red-violet flowers that produce few berries.

References

Potato cultivars